Timothy Neil Allan is a public relations consultant and was an advisor to Tony Blair from 1992 to 1998. He is the founder and managing director of Portland Communications in London, England. In April 2012 it was reported that Allan was set to sell a majority stake in Portland to US marketing services company Omnicom for £20 million.

Education
He was educated at the Royal Grammar School, Guildford, Godalming Sixth Form College, and Pembroke College, Cambridge (B.A., 1992).

Career
Between leaving work within politics and setting up his consultancy he was director of corporate communications at BSkyB.

His political advisor roles were researcher for Tony Blair when he was shadow home secretary, deputy press secretary to Tony Blair, when leader of the Labour Party and from 1997 he was deputy director of communications at 10 Downing Street.

References

External links
 Portland Communications

Living people
British public relations people
Labour Party (UK) officials
British special advisers
People educated at Royal Grammar School, Guildford
Alumni of Pembroke College, Cambridge
Year of birth missing (living people)